Deltasuchus ("delta crocodile") is a genus of neosuchian crocodyliform from the Late Cretaceous of Texas, specifically in the Woodbine Formation, which was a part of the Appalachian continent during the Cretaceous. It is known from one species, D. motherali, named in 2017 by Thomas Adams, Christopher Noto, and Stephanie Drumheller. In 2021, new material was described, allowing Deltasuchus to be placed within the family Paluxysuchidae as the sister taxon to Paluxysuchus.

References

Late Cretaceous crocodylomorphs of North America
Fossil taxa described in 2017
Prehistoric pseudosuchian genera